Dharmashastra National Law University, Jabalpur is a National Law University located at Jabalpur, Madhya Pradesh, India. It was established by the Madhya Pradesh Dharmashastra National Law University Ordinance in 2018. As of 2021, the chancellor of the university is Chief Justice of Madhya Pradesh High Court HON'BLE SHRI JUSTICE RAVI MALIMATH and the vice-chancellor is Prof V Nagaraj

Overview

The University has been allotted 120 acres of land in the surroundings close to the Jabalpur Airport. Till the development of the infrastructure is completed, the University shall function at the Bharat Ratna Bhim Rao Ambedkar Institute of Telcom Training (BRBRAITT), Ridge Road, Jabalpur. DNLU offers a five-year integrated course BA-LLB (Hons) and one-year LLM programme.

Affiliations
DNLU Jabalpur is recognised by the University Grants Commission (UGC) as a state university.

Research centres
 Centre For Alternative Dispute Resolution
 Centre For Research In Competition Law And Policy
 Centre For Criminal Justice Administration
 Centre For Environmental Law
 Centre For Research And Studies In Human Rights

Scholarships
Various scholarship can be availed by the candidates provided by the home state, other states and the central government.

Legal Aid Clinic 'Vidhi Mitra'
Dharmashastra National Law University launched a legal aid clinic termed 'Vidhi Mitra' on 18 December 2020 with the aim to raise awareness and empower individuals regarding issues involving the law. It also launched a program named 'Adhyapan' which provides educational aid for financially weak students.

References

External links
 

Law schools in Madhya Pradesh

2018 establishments in Madhya Pradesh
Educational institutions established in 2018